Nevada's at-large congressional district was created when Nevada was granted statehood in 1864, encompassing the entire state. It existed until 1983, when it eliminated as a result of the redistricting cycle after the 1980 Census and subsequent reapportionment in which Nevada was awarded a second seat in the House of Representatives. Nevada began electing two representatives from separate districts commencing with the election of 1982 and the 98th Congress.

List of members representing the district

Notes

References
 
 

 Congressional Biographical Directory of the United States 1774–present

At-large
Former congressional districts of the United States
At-large United States congressional districts
Constituencies established in 1864
1864 establishments in Nevada
Constituencies disestablished in 1983
1983 disestablishments in Nevada